Ethel Lily May Thorpe  (1908 – December 4, 2001) was a British-Canadian nurse.

Early life and education
Thorpe was born and raised in Norwich, England. During World War II, she served as a nursing sister for the British army.

Career
After the war, Thorpe was appointed Matron of the County Hospital at Shanghai, China. She later traveled to Jamaica where she established a training program for psychiatric nurses. By 1950, she was appointed  Matron of Bellevue Hospital, Jamaica. Thorpe also sat on the General Nursing Council of Jamaica. In honour of her contributions, she was the recipient of the 1956 Order of the British Empire.

In 1962, Thorpe was sent further into Jamaica by the Colonel Office to help them gain independence. In 1963, Thorpe immigrated to Canada to take a position as Nursing Consultant for the Sanatorium Board of Manitoba. She also served as co-ordinator for five hospitals.

In 1974, she was honoured by the Canadian Tuberculosis and Respiratory Disease Association as a lifetime member. A few years later, she was the recipient of the 1977 Queen Elizabeth II Silver Jubilee Medal and was awarded the 1981 Florence Nightingale Medal by the International Committee of the Red Cross Society.

Thorpe died on December 4, 2001.

References 

2001 deaths
British women nurses
English nurses
Queen Alexandra's Royal Army Nursing Corps officers
Members of the Order of the British Empire
Florence Nightingale Medal recipients
1908 births
People from Norwich
British emigrants to Canada